Route 234 is a provincial highway located in the Bas-Saint-Laurent region in the southeastern part of the province of Quebec. The highway runs from the junction of Route 232 in Saint-Narcisse-de-Rimouski and ends at the junction of Route 132 near Grand-Métis. The route runs concurrently with Highway 298 through Saint-Gabriel-de-Rimouski and then with Highway 132 near Sainte-Angele-de-Merici near the northwestern part of the 132 loop around the Gaspe Peninsula.

Municipalities along Route 234
 Saint-Narcisse-de-Rimouski
 Saint-Marcellin
 Saint-Gabriel-de-Rimouski
 Sainte-Angèle-de-Mérici
 Grand-Métis

See also
 List of Quebec provincial highways

References

External links 
 Official Transports Quebec Road Network Map 
 Route 234 on Google Maps

234